The 10,000 metres at the Summer Olympics is the longest track running event held at the multi-sport event. The men's 10,000 m has been present on the Olympic athletics programme since 1912. The women's event was added to the programme over seventy years later, at the 1988 Olympics. It is the most prestigious 10,000 m race at elite level. The competition format is a straight final between around 30 athletes, although prior to 2004 a qualifying round was held.

The Olympic records for the event were both set by Ethiopians at the 2008 Beijing Olympics and 2016 Rio Olympics: Kenenisa Bekele set the men's record at 27:01.17 minutes, while Almaz Ayana set the women's mark at 29:17.45 minutes. The 10,000 metres world record has been broken at the Olympics on two occasions; Lasse Virén's winning time of 27:38.35 minutes in 1972 stood as the record for less than a year, and Almaz Ayana knocked 14 seconds off the women's record in 2016.

Six men have won the Olympic title twice: Paavo Nurmi became the first in 1928 and he was followed by Emil Zátopek, Lasse Virén, Haile Gebrselassie, Kenenisa Bekele and Mo Farah. Two women have achieved the feat: Derartu Tulu won her second title in 2004 and Tirunesh Dibaba had back-to-back wins in 2008 and 2012. Derartu Tulu is the only athlete to have reached the podium on three occasions. Historically, athletes in this event have also had success in the 5000 metres at the Olympics. The winner of the men's Olympic 10,000 m has completed a long-distance track double on nine occasions, the most recent being Farah at the 2016 Rio Olympics. Tirunesh Dibaba and Sifan Hassan are the only women to complete this double  (at the 2008 Beijing Olympics and the 2020 Tokyo Olympics). At the 2016 Rio Olympics, Almaz Ayana smashed the world record in a time of 29:17.45. It was the first time four women broke 30 minutes in a single race.

Ethiopia is the most successful nation in the event, with ten gold medals among its total of 24. Finland is the next most successful, with six gold medals and thirteen overall. Finland's period of great success in early 20th century led to wide usage of the nickname the Flying Finns; Kaarlo Maaninka was the last Finnish athlete to medal over 10,000 m, in 1980. Kenya has won eleven medals, although Naftali Temu is the only Kenyan to have won Olympic gold.

It was not the first long-distance track event to feature at an Olympic competition: 5-mile (8 km) races featured at the 1906 Intercalated Games and the 1908 Summer Olympics before the metric 5000 metres and 10,000 m events were initiated.

Medal summary

Men

Multiple medalists

Medals by country

Women

Multiple medalists

Medalists by country

Five miles

Intercalated Games
The 1906 Intercalated Games were held in Athens and at the time were officially recognised as part of the Olympic Games series, with the intention being to hold a games in Greece in two-year intervals between the internationally held Olympics. However, this plan never came to fruition and the International Olympic Committee (IOC) later decided not to recognise these games as part of the official Olympic series. Some sports historians continue to treat the results of these games as part of the Olympic canon.

At this event a men's five-mile race was held – the first time a long-distance event featured at an Olympic competition. A British runner, Henry Hawtrey, won the event. Two 1908 Olympic participants for Sweden, John Svanberg and Edward Dahl, were the minor medalists.

1908 Olympics

References
Participation and athlete data
Athletics Men's 10,000 metres Medalists. Sports Reference. Retrieved on 2014-02-07.
Athletics Women's 10,000 metres Medalists. Sports Reference. Retrieved on 2014-02-07.
Athletics Men's 5 mile Medalists. Sports Reference. Retrieved on 2014-01-26.
Olympic record progressions
Mallon, Bill (2012). TRACK & FIELD ATHLETICS - OLYMPIC RECORD PROGRESSIONS. Track and Field News. Retrieved on 2014-02-07.
Specific

External links
IAAF 10,000 metres homepage
Official Olympics website
Olympic athletics records from Track & Field News

 
Olympics
10,000 metres